Zarah Bash (also Romanized as Zarah Bāsh and Zareh Bāsh; also known as Zarabāsh, Zar Bāsh, and Zard Bāsh) is a village in Abharrud Rural District, in the Central District of Abhar County, Zanjan Province, Iran. At the 2006 census, its population was 406, in 90 families.

References 

Populated places in Abhar County